Broom Hill is a small village in County Durham, England. 
It is situated to the north of Consett, near Ebchester and Medomsley.

References

Villages in County Durham
Consett